Malpighia  glabra is a tropical fruit-bearing shrub or small tree in the family Malpighiaceae. It has often been confused with the cultivated crop tree M. emarginata, but has small insipid fruit and a very different flower structure.

References

glabra
Plants described in 1753
Taxa named by Carl Linnaeus